Thereva is a genus of flies from the family Therevidae commonly known as stiletto flies.

Species
T. albohirta Kröber, 1912
T. albopilosa Kröber, 1912
T. albovittata Strobl, 1909
T. apicalis Wiedemann, 1821
T. aurata Loew, 1854
T. aurofasciata Kröber, 1912
T. bakeri Cole, 1923
T. bicinctella Costa, 1883
T. binotata Loew, 1847
T. biroi Kröber, 1913
T. brevicornis Loew, 1847
T. brunnea Cole, 1923
T. callosa Kröber, 1912
T. canescens Kröber, 1912
T. cincta Meigen, 1829
T. cingulata Kröber, 1912
T. cinifera Meigen, 1830
T. circumscripta Loew, 1847
T. comata Loew, 1869
T. concavifrons Kröber, 1914
T. confusa Kröber, 1913
T. diversa Coquillett, 1894
T. duplicis Coquillett, 1893
T. eggeri Lyneborg & Spitzer, 1974
T. egressa Coquillett, 1894
T. flavescens Loew, 1847
T. flavicauda Coquillett, 1904
T. flavicincta Loew, 1869
T. flavipilosa Cole, 1923
T. flavohirta Kröber, 1914
T. foxi Cole, 1923
T. frontalis Say, 1824
T. frontosa Kröber, 1912
T. fucata Loew, 1872
T. fucatoides Bromley, 1937
T. fulva (Meigen, 1804)
T. fuscinervis Zetterstedt, 1838
T. glaucescens Kröber, 1912
T. gomerae Baez, 1982
T. graeca Kröber, 1912
T. grancanariensis Baez, 1982
T. grisea Kröber, 1913
T. handlirschi Kröber, 1912
T. hilarimorpha Kröber, 1912
T. hirticeps Loew, 1874
T. hispanica Strobl, 1909
T. hyalina Kröber, 1913
T. inornata Verrall, 1909
T. insularis Becker, 1922
T. johnsoni Coquillett, 1893
T. lanata Zetterstedt, 1838
T. laufferi Strobl, 1909
T. macdunnoughi Cole, 1925
T. macedonica Kröber, 1912
T. maculipennis Kröber, 1912
T. marginula Meigen, 1820
T. microcephala Loew, 1847
T. nebulosa Kröber, 1912
T. neglecta Kröber, 1912
T. neomexicana Cole, 1923
T. nigrifrons Kröber, 1913
T. nigripilosa Cole, 1923
T. nitida Macquart, 1934
T. niveipennis Kröber, 1914
T. nobilitata (Fabricius, 1775)
T. obtecta Loew, 1847
T. occulta Becker, 1908
T. oculata Egger, 1859
T. opaca Kröber, 1913
T. pallipes Loew, 1869
T. plebeja (Linnaeus, 1758)
T. praecox Egger, 1859
T. pseudoculata Cole, 1923
T. punctipennis Wiedemann, 1821
T. rossica Becker, 1922
T. rufiventris Kröber, 1912
T. rustica Loew, 1840
T. sobrina Kröber, 1912
T. spiloptera Wiedemann, 1824
T. spinulosa Loew, 1847
T. strigata (Fabricius, 1794)
T. strigipes Loew, 1869
T. subnitida Kröber, 1913
T. teydea Frey, 1937
T. tomentosa Kröber, 1913
T. tristis Loew, 1847
T. tuberculata Loew, 1847
T. unica (Harris, 1780)
T. unicolor Kröber, 1913
T. ustulata Kröber, 1912
T. utahensis Hardy, 938 
T. valida Loew, 1847

References

Therevidae
Articles containing video clips
Asiloidea genera